The 2020 Toyota 500 was a NASCAR Cup Series race held on May 20, 2020, at Darlington Raceway in Darlington, South Carolina, replacing Richmond Raceway's Toyota Owners 400. Contested over 208 laps—shortened from 228 laps due to rain, on the  egg-shaped oval, it was the sixth race of the 2020 NASCAR Cup Series season and the 57th edition of the event.

There were three stages: first two were 75 laps each & the final was originally scheduled 78 laps, but reduced to 58 laps by weather.

Report

Background

The event was the second NASCAR Cup Series race held following a hiatus brought on by the COVID-19 pandemic in the United States, after the formal resumption of the season with The Real Heroes 400 three days earlier, also at Darlington. The race marked the first Cup Series event to be held on a Wednesday since the 1984 Firecracker 400 at Daytona (the race, at the time, was always held on July 4, regardless of day) — a race also noted for hosting Richard Petty's 200th and final Cup Series victory.  It was the 57th edition of the event, dating to the 1950 Southern 500 (the current Southern 500 traces its roots to the 1957 Rebel 300;  for the 2021 season, with two race meetings scheduled, Darlington swapped the lineage of both races).  It was the first scheduled Cup Series Darlington race with a scheduled 300 mile (or 500 km distance, which is similar) distance since 1963, when the Rebel 300 was run in two 150-mile heat races.

Entry list
 (R) denotes rookie driver.
 (i) denotes driver who are ineligible for series driver points.

Qualifying
Under modified operational procedures, no qualifying sessions were held for this race. The starting order was determined by the results of The Real Heroes 400, but with the order of the top 20 inverted.

Starting Lineup

Race

Stage Results

Stage One
Laps: 60

Stage Two
Laps: 65

Final Stage Results

Final Stage
Laps: 83

Race statistics
 Lead changes: 17 among 13 different drivers
 Cautions/Laps: 11 for 54
 Red flags: 1
 Time of race: 2 hours, 42 minutes and 23 seconds
 Average speed:   It was the slowest hardtop race since the 1958 Southern 500.

Media

Television
The Toyota 500 was carried by FS1 in the United States. Mike Joy and five-time Darlington winner Jeff Gordon covered the race from the Fox Sports studio in Charlotte. Matt Yocum handled the pit road duties. Larry McReynolds provided insight from the Fox Sports studio in Charlotte.

Radio
The Motor Racing Network (MRN) called the race for radio, which was simulcast on Sirius XM NASCAR Radio. Alex Hayden and Dave Moody called the action for MRN when the field raced down the front stretch. Dillon Welch called the race from a Billboard outside of turn 1 when the field raced through turns 1 and 2, and Steve Post called the race atop of the Darlington Raceway Club outside of turn 3 when the field raced through turns 3 and 4. Kim Coon and Hannah Newhouse called the action on pit road for MRN.

Standings after the race

Drivers' Championship standings

Manufacturers' Championship standings

Note: Only the first 16 positions are included for the driver standings.

References

Toyota 500
NASCAR races at Darlington Raceway
Toyota 500
Toyota 500